Beatrice Louise "Beattie" Edmondson (born 19 June 1987) is an English actress. She played the main character “Kate” in the BBC Three sitcom Josh.

Early life
Beatrice Louise Edmondson is the middle daughter of comedians Ade Edmondson and Jennifer Saunders.  She grew up in Devon with an elder sister, Ella, and a younger sister, Freya. After being educated at Exeter School, during her second year at her father's alma mater of the University of Manchester she decided not to audition for the Drama Society, instead forming a comedy group with four female friends. They appeared at the following Edinburgh Festival Fringe.

Career
After working the comedy circuit with the all-female sketch troupe, which they named Lady Garden (and later reformed as Birthday Girls with Rose Johnson and Camille Ucan) she broke through into television in 2008. She made her début in the Ben Elton sitcom The Wright Way, which was axed after one series. Her role in the 2015 six-part BBC Three series Josh was singled out by The Independent newspaper as "very watchable", saying her "comic timing stuck out". The show's second series was broadcast in 2016, with a third broadcast in October 2017.

Personal life
Edmondson married BBC News researcher Sam Francis on 4 June 2017. She gave birth to their first child in 2019. In 2021 the couple had a second child.

Filmography

References

External links
 
 

1987 births
Living people
21st-century English actresses
English television actresses
Alumni of the University of Manchester
People educated at Exeter School
Actresses from Devon
Place of birth missing (living people)